Przełazy  is a village in the administrative district of Gmina Lubrza, within Świebodzin County, Lubusz Voivodeship, in western Poland. The village is situated on the western shore of Niesłysz Lake.

The village has a population of 240.

The Przełazy (Seeläsgen) meteorite (102 kg) was found nearby in 1847.

Notable residents
 Hans-Karl Wittig (1918–1984) Luftwaffe officer

References

Villages in Świebodzin County